Gutendorf is a former municipality in the Weimarer Land district of Thuringia, Germany. Since 1 December 2008, it is part of Bad Berka.

Former municipalities in Thuringia